Whirlygig is the debut studio album by The Lovemongers.

The Lovemongers were a side project of singer-songwriting-musicians, and sisters, Ann and Nancy Wilson, better known as the frontwomen of the rock band Heart. They formed The Lovemongers with Sue Ennis and Frank Cox, and released Whirlygig in 1997 on Will Records. It contained all original material, with no outside writers.

Steve Huey of AllMusic gave the record 4 stars of 5, and he said that it "will likely appeal to fans of both Heart's earlier and later material."

Track listing
All songs written by Ann Wilson, Nancy Wilson and Sue Ennis, except where noted.

"City on the Hill" - 4:51
"Miracle Girl" - 4:45
"Two Black Lambs" - 4:45
"No School Today" (Ennis) - 4:16
"The Vegas Gene" (Wilson, Wilson, Ennis, Frank Cox) - 3:17
"Kiss" - 5:08
"Runaway" - 4:36
"Elysian" - 5:20
"Heavy Sedation" (Cox) - 4:52
"Sand" (Wilson, Wilson, Ennis, Cox) - 5:10

Personnel

The Lovemongers
Ann Wilson - vocals, acoustic & electric guitars, bass, flute, percussion
Nancy Wilson - vocals, acoustic & electric guitars, dulcimer, mandolin, drums, percussion
Sue Ennis - keyboards
Frank Cox - acoustic & electric guitars, mandolin, autoharp, sampling, drums, percussion

Additional musician 

 Ben Smith - drums and percussion

Production
The Lovemongers - arrangements, producers
Vaughn "Stepping Stone" Verdi - engineer, mixing
Daniel Mendez, Jason "Synergy" Shavey - engineers
Bernie Grundman - mastering

References

1997 debut albums
Heart (band)